Ryan Cuskelly (born 15 July 1987 in Lismore) is a professional squash player who represents Australia. He reached a career-high world ranking of World No. 12 in March 2017. He reached his first semi-final of a World Series tournament in the 2015 Qatar Classic. On 11 January 2020 Cuskelly announced his retirement from professional squash.

References

External links 

 
 
  (2010)
  (2014)
 

1987 births
Living people
Australian male squash players
Commonwealth Games medallists in squash
Commonwealth Games bronze medallists for Australia
Squash players at the 2010 Commonwealth Games
Squash players at the 2018 Commonwealth Games
Competitors at the 2013 World Games
People from Lismore, New South Wales
Sportsmen from New South Wales
20th-century Australian people
21st-century Australian people
Medallists at the 2010 Commonwealth Games